Si. Balasubramania Athithan  (also known as Si. Ba. Adithanar) 27 September 1905 – 24 May 1981), popularly called as "Adithanar", was an Indian lawyer, politician, minister and founder of the Tamil daily newspaper Dina Thanthi. He was the founder of the We Tamils party. He served as a member of the Madras Legislative Council for two terms and as a member of the Tamil Nadu Legislative Assembly for four terms. He was the Speaker of the Assembly during 1967–68 and Tamil Nadu's minister for Cooperation in the M. Karunanidhi cabinets of 1969 and 1971. In his memory, two Tamil literary awards were created and are awarded annually by his son, Sivanthi Adithanar ( former Director of the Dina Thanthi group).

Early life
Adithanar was born on 27 September 1905 at Kayamozhi in Tiruchendur Taluk of Tuticorin district to Sivanthi Adithanar  and Kanagam Ammayar as the heir of the Adityans, the highest aristocratic family among the Nelamaikkarars. His father, Sivanthi Adithanar , was a lawyer. Adithan' sister, Vamasundari Devi, was mother of  Indian business man Shiv Nadar. He completed his schooling at Srivaikuntam and joined  St. Joseph's College, Trichy. After obtaining a M. A, he went to Middle Temple, London to study law. He became a barrister in 1933 and practised in Singapore (during 1933–42) and later in his home town Srivaikuntam. He married Govindammal in 1933.

Publishing career
Adithan returned to India in 1942 when Singapore fell to the Japanese. He established a Tamil weekly magazine, Tamizhan, and a daily newspaper, Thanthi, in November 1942. He set out to found a Tamil daily along the lines of the English tabloid Daily Mirror, inspired by the Mirrors reach of a large audience. He established Dina Thanthi (lit. The Daily Telegraph) from Madurai in 1942  and it went on to become the flagship of his newspaper business. He expanded operations by opening additional editions in Tirunelveli, Madras, Salem and Tiruchirapalli in the 1940s. By bringing out local editions, Dina Thanthi helped deliver news on the same day to the people in southern districts of Tamil Nadu, who until then had to read day-old newspapers printed in Madras. The paper was popular and it was said that people learned to read the Tamil language to read the newspaper. The simplified language introduced by the paper helped it gain new readership.

Other publications from Adithan's Dina Thanthi group include the evening daily Maalai Murasu (lit. The Evening Drum), the weekly magazine Rani and the monthly novel imprint Rani Muthu.

Political career
Adithan started the "Tamil Rajyam" party in 1942. During 1947–52, he was a member of the Madras Legislative Council. He contested and won the 1952 election from Tiruchendur as a candidate of T. Prakasam's Kisan Mazdoor Praja Party. He was elected as an independent candidate in the 1957 election from Sathankulam.

Naam Tamilar party
In 1958, Adithan founded the "We Tamils" (நாம் தமிழர் கட்சி) party with the platform of forming a sovereign Tamil state. It wanted the creation of a homogeneous Greater Tamil Nadu incorporating Tamil speaking areas of India and Sri Lanka. The party's headquarters was named as Tamiḻaṉ Illam (lit. The Home of the Tamilian). In 1960, the party organised statewide protests for the secession of Madras and the establishment of a sovereign Tamil Nadu. The protests were marked by the burning of maps of India (with Tamil Nadu left out). Adithanar was arrested for organising them. The party along with M. P. Sivagnanam's Tamil Arasu Kazhagam was also involved in the movement to change the name of the state from Madras State to Tamil Nadu. Adithan lost the 1962 election from Tiruchendur and was elected to the Legislative Council in 1964. The WT contested the 1967 election as an ally of the Dravida Munnetra Kazhagam (DMK) under the DMK's "Rising Sun" symbol. It elected four members to the Assembly, including Adithan, who won from Srivaikuntam. The party merged with the DMK in 1967.

As Speaker of the Legislative Assembly
On 17 March 1967, Adithan became the speaker of the assembly defeating the Swatantra Party candidate K. S. Kothandaramiah, by 153 votes to 21. While he was the speaker he attended the DMK political conference held at Tanjore in 1968 and also took part in political activities in his constituency. Due to these activities, the opposition parties accused him of partisanship. He defended himself as:

Due to this controversy, Adithan resigned as speaker on 12 August 1968.

As minister
Adithan became the Minister for Cooperation in the M. Karunanidhi cabinet, which took power in February 1969. He was re-elected from Srivaikuntam in the 1971 elections and continued as the Minister for Cooperation.

Later political life
The DMK split in 1972, with M. G. Ramachandran forming the Anna Dravida Munnetra Kazhagam (ADMK). Adithan supported the ADMK. He contested and lost the 1977 election as an ADMK supported independent from Sathankulam. He also lost the 1980 election from Srivaikuntam.

Electoral performance in Assembly elections

Death and legacy
Adithan died on 24 May 1981. In 2005, the then Tamil Nadu Chief Minister, J. Jayalalitha announced that his home in Srivaikuntam, built in 1928, would be converted into a memorial. He is survived by two sons. B. Ramachandran Adityan (founder of Devi Weekly) and B. Sivanthi Adityan. On his birthday every year, the S. P. Adithanar Senior Tamil Scholar Award of Rs. 300,000 and the S. P. Adithanar Literary Award of Rs. 200,000 are awarded to Tamil scholars and people who excel in literature by Adithanar's son and the current director of the Dina Thanthi group, Sivanthi Adithan. A road in Chennai, connecting Egmore to Anna Salai, was named "Adithanar Salai" in his memory.

Bibliography
 Tamiḻp Pēraracu (lit. The Tamil empire) (1942)
 Idhalalar Kaiyedu (lit. The Journalist's Handbook)

References

Businesspeople from Tamil Nadu
Tamil businesspeople
1905 births
1981 deaths
Tamil Nadu ministers
Speakers of the Tamil Nadu Legislative Assembly
St Joseph's College, Tiruchirappalli alumni
Madras MLAs 1957–1962
Tamil Nadu MLAs 1967–1972
Tamil Nadu MLAs 1971–1976